John J. Cowell,  (1889 – 30 July 1918) was an Irish soldier, airman and flying ace of the First World War. He was credited with sixteen aerial victories; fifteen of these were gained as an observer/gunner and one as a pilot, before he was killed in action.

Early life and background
Cowell was born in Limerick, one of ten children of Michael and Kate Cowell.

First World War
Cowell first served in the 12th Field Company of the Royal Engineers, where on 27 October 1916 Sapper (Acting Corporal) Cowell was awarded his first Military Medal.

Cowell then transferred to the Royal Flying Corps, joining No. 20 Squadron as an observer/gunner during Bloody April 1917. He manned the guns of a F.E.2d fighter for such other aces as Richard M. Trevethan, Cecil Roy Richards, Reginald Condon, and Oliver Vickers. Between 5 May and 28 July 1917, Cowell gained fifteen victories, destroying a German two-seater reconnaissance aircraft and five German fighters, and driving down nine more German fighters out of control. He was promoted to sergeant, and awarded the Distinguished Conduct Medal, which was gazetted on 17 July 1917. His citation read:

On 14 September 1917 Cowell received a Bar to his Military Medal. He then returned to the Home Establishment for flight training, rejoining No. 20 Squadron as a pilot in mid-1918.

On 29 July 1918, while flying a Bristol F.2b, Cowell drove down a Fokker D.VII, his last, and only aerial victory as a pilot. He was killed in action the following day, shot down by Friedrich Ritter von Röth of Jasta 16. Cowell is buried in Longuenesse Souvenir Cemetery, Saint-Omer, France.

List of aerial victories

References
Notes

Bibliography 
 
 

1889 births
1918 deaths
Military personnel from Limerick (city)
Royal Engineers soldiers
Royal Flying Corps soldiers
Royal Air Force airmen
Recipients of the Distinguished Conduct Medal
Recipients of the Military Medal
Irish World War I flying aces
British Army personnel of World War I
Royal Air Force personnel of World War I
British military personnel killed in World War I
Aviators killed by being shot down